The women's 400 metres event  at the 1993 IAAF World Indoor Championships was held on 12 and 14 March.

Medalists

Results

Heats
First 2 of each heat (Q) qualified directly for the final.

Final

References

400
400 metres at the World Athletics Indoor Championships
1993 in women's athletics